NBL1 South is a NBL1 conference based in South East Australia, comprising both a men's and women's competition. In 2019, Basketball Victoria partnered with the National Basketball League (NBL) to create NBL1 to replace the South East Australian Basketball League (SEABL), Australia's pre-eminent semi-professional basketball league between 1981 and 2018. NBL1 South was the lone conference in 2019, with Queensland and South Australia joining in 2020. Due to the COVID-19 pandemic, the NBL1 South did not have a season in 2020 and only half a season in 2021.

History 
In 2019, the NBL1 had only one conference. With the inclusion of Queensland and South Australia in 2020, the 2019 NBL1 teams formed the new South Conference. Whilst the Basketball Australia Centre of Excellence team and the now-defunct Hobart Huskies withdrew ahead of the 2020 season, the Hobart Chargers and Mount Gambier Pioneers joined the conference and kept the number of teams at 18. However, due to the COVID-19 pandemic, the 2020 season was cancelled.

On 1 September 2021, the 2021 NBL1 South season was cancelled due to the COVID-19 pandemic in Victoria. With a combined 154 men's and women's games that could not be completed, it was decided to abandon the season with no champions and no individual awards.

Current clubs 

* Teams that transferred from the South East Australian Basketball League (SEABL).

** Teams that transferred from the Big V (Victoria).

*** Teams that transferred from the Premier League (South Australia).

Former and defunct teams 
 Albury Wodonga Bandits (2019–2021) – moved to NBL1 East in 2022
 BA Centre of Excellence (2019) – competed in the Waratah League in 2020 and 2021
 Hobart Huskies (2019) – now defunct

Honours

List of Champions

Awards 

 Most Valuable Player
 Defensive Player of the Year
 Youth Player of the Year
 All-Star Five
 Coach of the Year
 Referee of the Year
 Club of the Year

References

External links 

 
NBL1
Basketball in South Australia
Basketball in Tasmania
Basketball in Victoria (Australia)
NBL1 South
2019 establishments in Australia
Sports leagues established in 2019